Bueyeros is an unincorporated community in Harding County, New Mexico, United States. Its name comes from a Spanish word meaning "ox drivers".

The Bueyeros School, which is listed on the National Register of Historic Places, is located in Bueyeros.

References

Unincorporated communities in Harding County, New Mexico
Unincorporated communities in New Mexico